Syro-Anatolian may refer to:

 someone or something related both to historical regions of Syria and Anatolia, like:
 Syro-Anatolian states of the Iron Age - term for ancient Luwian and Aramean states during the Iron Age

 someone or something related to Syrian/Syriac presence or influence in Anatolia, like:
 Syro-Anatolian Christianity - Christian communities of both Syriac Rites (eastern and western), in Anatolia

See also
 Syria (disambiguation)
 Syrian (disambiguation)
 Syriac (disambiguation)
 Anatolia (disambiguation)
 Anatolian (disambiguation)